The Pronya is a river in Ryazan and Tula Oblasts in Russia, a right tributary of the Oka. The river freezes up in late November and stays icebound until early March. The Pronya is navigable in its lower reaches. The town of Mikhailov is located on the Pronya.

References 

Rivers of Ryazan Oblast
Rivers of Tula Oblast